The iron maiden is a torture device, consisting of a solid iron cabinet with a hinged front and spike-covered interior, sufficiently tall to enclose a human being. The first stories citing the iron maiden were composed in the 18th century. The use of iron maidens is considered to be a myth, heightened by the belief that people of the Middle Ages were uncivilized; evidence of their actual use is difficult to find. They have become a very popular image in media involving the Middle Ages.

History 

Despite its reputation as a medieval instrument of torture, there is no evidence of the existence of iron maidens before the 19th century. There are, however, ancient reports of the Spartan tyrant Nabis using a similar device around 200 B.C. for extortion and murder. The Abbasid vizier Ibn al-Zayyat is said to have created a "wooden oven-like chest that had iron spikes" for torture, which would ironically be used during his own imprisonment and execution in 847.

Wolfgang Schild, a professor of criminal law, criminal law history, and philosophy of law at the Bielefeld University, has argued that putative iron maidens were pieced together from artifacts found in museums to create spectacular objects intended for (commercial) exhibition. Several 19th-century iron maidens are on display in museums around the world, including the San Diego Museum of Man, the Meiji University Museum, and several torture museums in Europe.

Possible inspirations 
The 19th-century iron maidens may have been constructed as probable misinterpretation of a medieval Schandmantel, which was made of wood and metal but without spikes. Inspiration for the iron maiden may also have come from the Carthaginian execution of Marcus Atilius Regulus as recorded in Tertullian's "To the Martyrs" (Chapter 4) and Augustine of Hippo's The City of God (I.15), in which the Carthaginians "shut him into a tight wooden box, where he was forced to stand, spiked with the sharpest nails on all sides so that he could not lean in any direction without being pierced," or from Polybius' account of Nabis of Sparta's deadly statue of his wife, the Iron Apega (earliest form of the device).

The iron maiden of Nuremberg 

The most famous iron maiden that popularized the design was that of Nuremberg, first displayed possibly as far back as 1802. The original was lost in the Allied bombing of Nuremberg in 1945. A copy "from the Royal Castle of Nuremberg", crafted for public display, was sold through J. Ichenhauser of London to the Earl of Shrewsbury in 1890 along with other torture devices, and, after being displayed at the World's Columbian Exposition, Chicago, 1893, was taken on an American tour. This copy was auctioned in the early 1960s and is now on display at the Medieval Crime Museum, Rothenburg ob der Tauber.

Origins 
Some historians have argued that Johann Philipp Siebenkees made up the history of the device. According to Siebenkees' colportage, it was first used on August 14, 1515, to execute a coin forger.

See also 
 Pear of anguish - another supposed medieval torture device with little actual evidence of use
 Brazen bull
 Ducking stool

References

Further reading

External links 
 
 Infernal Device: Iron Maiden at Occasional Hell

European instruments of torture
Hoaxes
Misconceptions
Torture